Rok Radović (born February 4, 2001) is a Slovenian professional basketball player for Cedevita Olimpija of the ABA league. He is a 1.99m tall Small forward.

Professional career
Radović started playing professional basketball for Cedevita Zagreb. During the 2019–20 season, he was loaned to OKK Beograd of the Basketball League of Serbia. In August 2021, he joined Cedevita Junior.

References

External links
 Eurobasket.com profile
 REALGM profile
 PROBALLERS profile

2001 births
Living people
Basketball League of Serbia players
KK Cedevita Olimpija players
OKK Beograd players
Small forwards
Shooting guards
Slovenian expatriate basketball people in Serbia
Slovenian men's basketball players
Slovenian people of Croatian descent
Basketball players from Ljubljana
KK Cedevita Junior players
KK Cedevita players